Alpha United Football Club is a Guyanese football club based in Providence. The club competes in the GFF Elite League, the top league of football in Guyana. They were league champions in the 2009–10, 2010, 2012, 2012–13, and 2013–14 seasons.

In 2011, Alpha United gained recognition as being the first Guyanese football club to qualify for the CONCACAF Champions League, North America's premier continental club tournament. Alpha United earned berth into the Champions League by finishing in third place in the subcontinental tournament, the CFU Club Championship, which they earned a berth into through winning the National Super League.

They finished third in the 2011 CFU-CC and qualified for the preliminary round of the 2011–12 CONCACAF Champions League, becoming the first club from Guyana to play in the CONCACAF Champions League. In the playoff for third place, Alpha United created history by beating Trinidad and Tobago's Defence Force on penalty kicks (4–3) after regulation and overtime failed to break the 1–1 deadlock.

In their previous match, Alpha United met with the Puerto Rico Islanders in the 2011 CFU-CC semifinals, but after another regular time 1–1 draw, The Hammer succumbed to the 2010 Defending CFU-CC Champions 3–1 in the 30-minute overtime.

In the Champions League, Alpha United traveled to Costa Rica to take on Herediano. In their first ever Champions League match, the side fell 8–0 managing only two shots on goal. The side fared better in the second leg, at one point taking a 2–0 lead before relinquishing the lead, and settling for a 2–2 draw and a subsequent elimination from the tournament, losing 2–10 on aggregates.

Alpha United also participated in the 2009 and 2010 CFU-CCs. In 2009, The Hammer lost to Haiti's Tempête FC in their 1st Round home and away tie. In 2010, they were eliminated by Trinidad and Tobago's San Juan Jabloteh in the 2nd Round Group Stage.

History 

The origins of Alpha United FC are unknown,  as CONCACAF's records show their foundation date as "pending". According to Rec.Sport.Soccer Statistics Foundation it appears that the club has been playing in Guyanese football competitions since the early to mid-2000s mounting their success in the later half of the 2000s. In 2009, Alpha United earned their first ever league title winning the Guyana National Football League and gaining subsequent entry into the CFU Club Championship.

Alpha United gained attention across the continent in 2011, when the club defeated the TT Pro League champions, Defence Force in the consolation match to earn a preliminary round berth in the CONCACAF Champions League, being the first ever Guyanese club in Champions League history to earn a berth.

Colours and Badge 
Alpha United's crest features a blue diamond with golden trim as the background. In front of the diamond is a hammer. Beneath the hammer, lies the club's motto, Unity With Strength. Above the hammer lies the club's name and their nickname, "The Hammer".

Stadium 
It is not known what stadium is Alpha United's permanent home, although Providence Stadium near Georgetown is serving as the host venue for United in the CONCACAF Champions League.

Honors

Continental 
 CFU Club Championship
 Third Place (1): 2011

Domestic

League titles 
 Guyana National Football League
 Winners (5): 2009, 2010, 2012, 2012–13, 2013–14

Cups 
 Guyana Mayors Cup
 Winners (2): 2007–08, 2013
 GFF Super 8 Cup
 Winners (1): 2010
 Kashif & Shanghai Cup
 Runners-up (1): 2009–10
NAMLICO Knock-out Tournament
 Winners (1): 2010

Performance in CONCACAF competitions 
Alpha United's score listed first, as well as the home leg.

2009 CFU Club Championship
First round v.  Tempête – 1:1, 0:2

2010 CFU Club Championship
First round v.  Elite – w/o
First round v.  WBC – 1:1
First round v.  Defence Force – 3:1
Second round v.  San Juan Jabloteh – 0:2
Second round v.  River Plate PR – 1:1

2011 CFU Club Championship
Elimination stage 1 v.  Bassa – w/o
Elimination stage 2 v.  River Plate PR – 0:0, 3:2
Semifinals v.  Puerto Rico Islanders – 1:3 (a.e.t)
Third Place Playoff v.  Defence Force – 1:1 (4:3 pen.)

2011–12 CONCACAF Champions League
Preliminary round v.  Herediano – 2:2, 0:8

2014 CFU Club Championship
Group Stage v.  Defence Force – 2:0
Group Stage v.  Harbour View – 1:0
Semifinals v.  Valencia – Cancelled

2014–15 CONCACAF Champions League
Group Stage v.  Olimpia – 0:1, TBD
Group Stage v.  Portland Timbers – 1:4, TBD

See also 
Football in Guyana
GFF Elite League

References 
General
Club honors cited to: 
Footnotes

External links 
Alpha United FC profile on CONCACAF.com

Football clubs in Guyana